Fernando Saunders is an American musician, singer and record producer from Detroit, Michigan. He is perhaps best known for his longtime partnership with musician Lou Reed, from 1982 to 1987 and again from 1996 to 2008.

Biography
Fernando Saunders has performed all around the world with music legends such as Marianne Faithfull, Joan Baez, Slash, Gavin Friday, Tori Amos, Pat Benatar, Steve Winwood, Jimmy Page, John McLaughlin, Heart, Jan Hammer, Luciano Pavarotti, Eric Clapton, Jeff Beck, Ron Wood and Charlie Watts from The Rolling Stones, Robert Quine, Anohni, Steve Hunter, Kevin Hearn, Julieta Venegas, Grayson Hugh and Suzanne Vega. He is also a long-time collaborator with Kip Hanrahan and Lou Reed (as a bass player, vocalist and producer).

Personal life
Fernando's son, András Kállay-Saunders (born January 28, 1985) represented Hungary in the 2014 edition of the Eurovision Song Contest with the song "Running".

Fernando’s daughter, Marisa Saunders (born September 16, 1996), is also a bassist in the band No Vacation.

Selected discography

Solo
Cashmere Dreams (1989; Grudge/BMG)
The Spin (1993; A&M)
I Will Break Your Fall (2006; Summit/Sony Red7)
Plant a Seed (2011; EMI)
Happiness (2012; Videoradio)

with Larry Young
Fuel (1975)

with Jan Hammer
Oh Yeah? (1976)
Melodies (1977)
"Black Sheep" (1979)

with Jeff Beck
Jeff Beck with the Jan Hammer Group Live  (1977)

with John McLaughlin

Electric Guitarist (1978)
Electric Dreams (1979)

with Pat Benatar
Wide Awake in Dreamland (1988)

with Grayson Hugh
Blind To Reason (1988; RCA)

with Deborah Henson-Conant
Caught in the Act (1990)
Talking Hands (1991)

with Heart
The Road Home (1995)

with George Jinda
Between Dreams (1995)

with Special EFX
Special EFX (1984)
Just Like Magic (1990)
Peace of the World (1991)
Global Village (1992)
Here To Stay (1996)
Masterpiece (1999)

with Chieli Minucci
Renaissance (1995)
Sweet on You (2000)

with Kip Hanrahan
Tenderness (1990)
Piñero Soundtrack (2002)
Beautiful Scars (2007)

with Lou Reed
The Blue Mask (1982)
Legendary Hearts (1983)
Live in Italy (1984)
New Sensations (1984)
Mistrial (1986)
Set the Twilight Reeling (1996)
Perfect Night: Live in London (1998)
Ecstasy (2000)
The Raven (2003)
Animal Serenade (2004)
Berlin: Live at St. Ann's Warehouse (2008)

Film
 A Night with Lou Reed (1983)
 Coney Island Baby: Live in Jersey (Lou Reed) (1987)
 Lou Reed: Rock and Roll Heart (1998)
 Lou Reed: Live at Montreux (2000)
 Prozac Nation (2001)
 Spanish Fly: Lou Reed Live in Spain (2005)
 Berlin: Live at St. Ann's Warehouse (Lou Reed-Julian Schnabel) (2008)
 CZizinci (2011)

References

External links
 
 The video production website Springo Studio, producer of the music video Where did you go

American male bass guitarists
American rock bass guitarists
American rock singers
American male singers
Living people
Musicians from Detroit
1950s births
20th-century American bass guitarists
20th-century American male musicians